William W. Freehling (born 1935) is an American historian, and Singletary Professor of the Humanities Emeritus at the University of Kentucky. Freehling has written several well-respected works on the American South during the antebellum era and on the American Civil War, most notably Prelude to Civil War: The Nullification Controversy in South Carolina, which won the 1967 Bancroft Prize, and a two-volume work on the antebellum period, Road to Disunion.

Awards
 1965 Allan Nevins Prize of the Society of American Historians
 1967 Bancroft Prize
 Senior Fellow at the Virginia Foundation for the Humanities 
 2007 Louis R. Gottschalk Lecture

Works
"Arthur Schlesinger Jr: William W. Freehling Remembers", OUP blog

"The Civil War: Repressible or Irrepressible" (with Allan Nevins), in Francis G. Couvares, George Athan Billias, Martha Saxton, eds., Interpretations of American History: Through Reconstruction. Simon & Schuster. 

The South vs. the South: How Anti-Confederate Southerners Shaped the Course of the Civil War. Oxford University Press, 2001
Becoming Lincoln. University of Virginia Press, 2018.

References

Further reading
 Ward, John William 1955. Andrew Jackson, Symbol for an Age. New York: Oxford University Press.

External links

"The South Vs. the South, Reviewed by Gary Smith, Department of History, University of Dundee", American Studies Online, 14 November 2005
"A Very Special Visit: William W. Freehling", Civil War Memory, September 25, 2007
"Historical Reconstructions", The Historical Society, 2002
"Four American Presidents (But What Did They Have to Do with the Civil War?)", The Museum of the Confederacy, February 20, 2010

1935 births
University of Kentucky faculty
Living people
21st-century American historians
American male non-fiction writers
Bancroft Prize winners
21st-century American male writers